Markus Olsen Pettersen (born 12 February 1999) is a Norwegian footballer who plays as a goalkeeper for Brann in the Tippeligaen.

Career
On 14 January 2019, Nest-Sotra signed Pettersen from SK Brann on a season-long loan deal.

References

External links
Profile at Nest-Sotra
Profile at NFF

1999 births
Living people
People from Askøy
Norwegian footballers
Norway youth international footballers
Association football goalkeepers
SK Brann players
Nest-Sotra Fotball players
Eliteserien players
Norwegian First Division players
Sportspeople from Vestland